Gowdu (also Romanized as Gowdū; also known as Gowdū Pā’īn) is a village in Band-e Zarak Rural District, in the Central District of Minab County, Hormozgan Province, Iran. At the 2006 census, its population was 918, in 161 families.

References 

Populated places in Minab County